Pad is an extinct town in Roane County, West Virginia.

The community took its name from nearby Pad Fork creek.

References 

Ghost towns in West Virginia
Landforms of Roane County, West Virginia